Meydan-e Shohada Metro Station, translated as Shohada Square Metro Station is an interchange station between Tehran Metro Line 4 and Line 6. Originally it started as the eastern terminus of line 4 which got subsequently extended further. Since April 2019 line 6 is terminating here. 

The station is located in Shohada Square along 17th of Shahrivar Ave. It is between Ebn-e Sina Metro Station and Darvazeh Shemiran Metro Station.

References

Tehran Metro stations